Stefan Edberg defeated Goran Ivanišević 4–6, 6–4, 6–2, 6–2 to win the 1994 Eurocard Open singles event. Michael Stich was the defending champion.

Seeds

Draws

Key
Q – Qualifier
WC – Wild Card

Finals

Section 1

Section 2

External links
 ATP Singles draw

Singles